Healing is a mini-LP and the third studio album by the American psychedelic rock band Weird Owl, released on October 15, 2013. The short-length album was released by A Recordings, Ltd., unlike Weird Owl's previous studio albums, Ever the Silver Cord Be Loosed and Build Your Beast a Fire, which were released under the label of Tee Pee Records. Healing received generally mixed reviews upon its release.

Reception

David Maine, writing for PopMatters, gave the mini-LP five out of ten possible stars, calling it a "mixed-bag". SLUG Magazine reported that the "five songs are enjoyable and worth the 27 minutes of listening time—especially if you're on a comfortable couch in a room with good mood lighting. I wasn't while listening to Healing, and it was still a pleasant experience".

Track listing

Personnel
 Trevor Tyrrell – guitar, lead vocals
 Jon Rudd – guitar
 Kenneth Cook – bass guitar, keyboards, synths, back-up vocals
 Sean Reynolds – drums
 John Cassidy – keyboards, synths

References

2013 albums
Weird Owl albums